Paul Harding (born 1967) is an American musician and author, best known for his debut novel Tinkers (2009), which won the 2010 Pulitzer Prize for Fiction and the 2010 PEN/Robert W. Bingham Prize among other honors. Harding was the drummer in the band Cold Water Flat throughout its existence from 1990 to 1996.

Life and career
Paul Harding grew up on the north shore of Boston in the town of Wenham, Massachusetts. As a youth he spent a lot of time "knocking about in the woods," which he attributes to his love of nature. His grandfather fixed clocks and he apprenticed under him, an experience that found its way into his novel Tinkers.  Harding has a B.A. in English from the University of Massachusetts Amherst and an MFA from the Iowa Writers' Workshop and has taught writing at Harvard University and the University of Iowa.

After graduating from the University of Massachusetts, he spent time touring with his band Cold Water Flat in the US and Europe. He had always been a heavy reader and recalls reading Carlos Fuentes' Terra Nostra and thinking "this is what I want to do". In that book Harding "saw the entire world, all of history". When he next had time off from touring with the band he signed up for a summer writing class at Skidmore College in New York. His teacher was Marilynne Robinson and through her he learned about the Iowa Writers' Workshop writing program. There he studied with Barry Unsworth, Elizabeth McCracken and later Robinson. At some point he realized some of the people he admired most were "profoundly religious" and so he spent years reading theology, and was "deeply" influenced by Karl Barth and John Calvin. He considers himself a "self-taught modern New England transcendentalist".

Musically, he admires jazz drummers and considers John Coltrane's drummer, Elvin Jones, the greatest.
	
Harding's second novel, Enon (2013), concerns characters from his first novel, Tinkers, looking at the lives of George Crosby's grandson, Charlie Crosby, and his daughter Kate.

Harding lives near Boston with his wife and two sons.

Awards and honors
2010 Pulitzer Prize for Fiction, winner
2010 PEN/Robert W. Bingham Prize, winner
2012 Fernanda Pivano Award

Works
Tinkers (New York: Bellevue Literary Press, 2009. )
Enon (New York: Random House, 2013. )
This Other Eden (New York: W. W. Norton & Company, 2023. )

References

External links
Interview with Paul Harding, on Beyond the Margins
Reading from Tinkers and discussing bringing his book into existence at the Maine Festival of the Book, April 2011
Interview with Jeffrey Brown, PBS Newshour, April 16, 2010

1967 births
Living people
21st-century American novelists
American male novelists
Pulitzer Prize for Fiction winners
University of Massachusetts Amherst alumni
Iowa Writers' Workshop alumni
People from Wenham, Massachusetts
21st-century American male writers
20th-century American drummers
American male drummers
20th-century American male musicians